Wilderstein is a 19th-century Queen-Anne-style country house on the Hudson River in Rhinebeck, Dutchess County, New York, United States. It is a not-for-profit house museum.

Background
Thomas Holy Suckley was a wealthy property developer in Manhattan. He was the son of devout Methodist George Suckley and his second wife Catherine Rutsen. George settled in New York City and became agent for the British mercantile establishment that would later become Holy, Newbould, & Suckley. He was well acquainted with most of the prominent Methodists of the time and active in supporting their ministry.

Thomas Suckley's mother Catherine was the daughter of John Rutsen, whose maternal grandfather was Gilbert Livingston, son of Robert Livingston, Lord of Livingston Manor. John Rutsen was a close friend of Catherine Livingston Garrettson, the wife of the notable Methodist preacher, Freeborn Garrettson (1752 – 1827). In 1799, the Garrettsons purchased 160 acres in Rhinebeck, New York, where they established an estate called Wildercliff, and welcomed many circuit riding Methodist preachers. Frequent visitor Francis Asbury called it "Traveler's Rest". Around 1850, the estate passed to their only child, Mary Rutherford Garrettson.

History
The Wilderstein property was originally part of the Wildercliff estate. In June 1853, Thomas Suckley, purchased from Mary Garrettson thirty-rwo acres of river-front property, which until then had served as a sheep meadow for the adjacent Wildercliff estate.<ref>[https://dchsny.org/wp-content/uploads/2018/07/Wildercliff-4MannyAndrew.pdf "Wildercliff", Year Book Dutchess County Historical Society, vol. 17, 1932]</ref> (Mary Garrettson's mother Catherine was the granddaughter of Gilbert Livingston's older brother, Robert Livingston of Clermont).  

Suckley and his wife Catherine Murray Bowne chose the property as a building site for their mansion, because they considered the landscape a good match for their picturesque aesthetic ideal. The name "Wilderstein" ("wild stone" in German) was chosen by Suckley to allude to an American Indian petroglyph found nearby and reflect the site's
historical significance.

In total, three generations of the Suckley family inhabited the mansion. The last family member was Daisy Suckley, a cousin of Franklin D. Roosevelt for whom she trained his famous terrier Fala. Daisy Suckley died in the Wilderstein mansion in 1991, six months before her 100th birthday. The mansion is nine miles up-river, on the same side, from FDR's Hyde Park Home, Springwood.

Description

The mansion commissioned for the site was a two-storey Italianate villa designed by architect John Warren Ritch. In 1888, Thomas Suckley's son Robert Bowne Suckley and his wife, Elizabeth Philips Montgomery, undertook a remodelling and enlargement of the house. This work was carried out by the local architect Arnout Cannon from Poughkeepsie. The style of the mansion was changed to a Queen Anne style country house. A third floor, a multi-gabled attic, a circular five-storey tower, a porte-cochère, and a verandah were added in the process. The new interior of the building was designed by Joseph Burr Tiffany, a cousin of Louis Comfort Tiffany. The rooms of ground floor were done in Historic Revival Style and in the aesthetic movement style using materials such as use mahogany, leather, stained glass, and linen.

In parallel to the redesign of the mansion proper, the grounds of the estate were transformed by landscape architect Calvert Vaux according to the American Romantic Landscape style. Vaux's design comprised the creation of a network of drives and trails, the positioning of specimen trees and ornamental shrubs as well as the placement of an eclectic set of out buildings such as a carriage house, a gate lodge, and a potting shed. Gazebos and garden seats were positioned at carefully chosen vantage points.

Preservation
Daisy Suckley was instrumental in forming Wilderstein Preservation, a private non-profit organization. She opened the house to the public at Christmas 1984. The society is a recognized charity by the IRS; donations are tax deductible. Although little restoration work was carried out during her lifetime, responsible stewardship is becoming the norm now that concerned parties are supplying funds. For example, the tower was renovated in 1994, the main roof replaced in 1997, the siding on the second and third floor was restored in 2001, repairs on the porte-cochere and the north porch in 2002, and restoration work on the verandah in 2006.

Location
The address of the mansion is 330 Morton Road, Rhinebeck, NY 12572, New York. It is a contributing property to the Hudson River Historic District and a National Historic Landmark.

Further readingGreat Houses of the Hudson River'', Michael Middleton Dwyer, editor, with preface by Mark Rockefeller, Boston, MA: Little, Brown and Company, published in association with Historic Hudson Valley, 2001; .

References

External links

 At the Home of FDR's Secret Friend, September 7, 2007 by Barbara Ireland, The New York Times - Travel section feature covering Wilderstein as well as Top Cottage.
Official web site of Wilderstein Preservation, the IRS-recognized charity maintaining the site.
Wilderstein on Historic Structures

Livingston family 
Livingston family residences
Museums in Dutchess County, New York
Houses in Rhinebeck, New York
Historic house museums in New York (state)
Historic district contributing properties in New York (state)
Gilded Age mansions
Queen Anne architecture in New York (state)